Chrétien François de Lamoignon de Bâville, also written as Chrétien François de Lamoignon de Basville (1735–1789) was a French statesman and magistrate.

Lamoignon was the Keeper of the Seals of France from 8 April 1787 to 14 September 1788. In this position, he was responsible for issuing the Edict of Versailles in 1787, which granted civil status and freedom of worship to France's Protestants, and for the abolition of judicial torture.

In 1789 he was found dead in his home, possibly by suicide.

References

1735 births
1789 deaths
French politicians